Abdelhalim El-Kholti (born 17 October 1980) is a French former footballer. He is of Moroccan descent.

Football career
El-Khotli won the Conference National with Yeovil Town, but was part of the Cambridge United side that was relegated from the Football League two years later. But El-Kholti remained in Football League Two after joining Chester City for a season, before dropping into non-league football himself with Weymouth.

El-Kholti was sold to Grays Athletic following Weymouth's financial crisis, after a handful of appearances for Grays he left by mutual consent in August 2007. Linking up with ex-Weymouth manager, Garry Hill he then joined Rushden & Diamonds shortly after. However, he was released at the end of the 2007–08 season.

On 17 June 2008, it was announced that El-Kholti had joined fellow Conference side Woking. He then joined Hayes & Yeading United in 2009, but made just one appearance for the club in the Middlesex Senior Cup.

After football
After his football career he opened Creperie, a pancake stall, in Canary Wharf.

References

External links

1980 births
Living people
People from Annemasse
French footballers
Association football fullbacks
Association football wingers
English Football League players
National League (English football) players
Servette FC players
Yeovil Town F.C. players
Cambridge United F.C. players
Chester City F.C. players
Weymouth F.C. players
Grays Athletic F.C. players
Rushden & Diamonds F.C. players
Woking F.C. players
Hayes & Yeading United F.C. players
French sportspeople of Moroccan descent
Sportspeople from Haute-Savoie
Footballers from Auvergne-Rhône-Alpes